The 2017–18 North Superleague is the seventeenth staging of the North Superleague, the highest tier of league competition in the North Region of the Scottish Junior Football Association. The winners of this competition are eligible to enter the 2018–19 Scottish Cup.

Member clubs for the 2017–18 season
Banks O' Dee are the reigning champions.

North First Division (East) champions Ellon United were promoted to the Superleague, however the West champions Spey Valley United declined promotion. An extra play-off spot would decide promotion/relegation. This spots would between North Superleague Clubs Dufftown and Buckie Rovers and in the North First Division (West) and (East) runners up Sunnybank and Montrose Roselea respectively. Dufftown defeated Sunnybank 3–2 to retain their Superleague place while Montrose Roselea were promoted after a 5–0 win over Buckie Rovers played at Colony Park.

League table

Results

Superleague play-offs

Semi-final

Final

References

2017–18 in Scottish football leagues
SJFA North Region Superleague seasons